Side Order of Life is an American dramatic television series broadcast by Lifetime on Sunday night. It premiered on Lifetime on July 15, 2007.  In its first five weeks it aired at 8:00pm ET/PT, then switched to the 9:00pm time slot. Lifetime broadcast Side Order of Life with State of Mind and Army Wives in an effort to offer a night of new original programming aimed primarily at female viewers during the summer hiatus. Initial reviews were positive.

Lifetime declined to renew Side Order of Life for a second season.

Premise
 Marisa Coughlan plays Jenny McIntyre, a photographer who reconsiders her life and is reawakened to her options after her best friend, Vivy Porter (Diana-Maria Riva), is diagnosed with a recurrence of cancer. Jason Priestley returns to regular series television as Ian Denison, Jenny's fiancé. Christopher Gartin rounds out the main cast as Jenny's boss Rick Purdy at the fictional In Person magazine; he is in love with Vivy, who has rejected him.

Cast

Main
Marisa Coughlan as Jenny McIntyre, a photojournalist at In Person magazine.
Diana-Maria Riva as Vivy Porter, Jenny's best friend, who is currently undergoing treatment for cancer.
Christopher Gartin as Rick Purdy, editor of In Person magazine, and secretly in love with Vivy
Jason Priestley as Ian Denison, Jenny's ex-fiancé, engaged to Becca despite warnings from friends about rebound relationships
Ashley Williams as Becca, Vivy's 'other best friend', who dated Ian in college, engaged to Ian currently.

In a moment of candor, when discussing his role on a female-oriented show on a female-oriented network, Jason Priestley referred to himself as "the man-meat," but stated, "I'm ok with that."

Recurring
Steven Weber (uncredited in episodes 1–12) as Cell Phone Man, whom Jenny called by accident when trying to reach Ian, and who she continued to call for reassurance and support.
Joe Regalbuto as Mr. McIntyre, Jenny's father, and a good friend of Ian's, even after the breakup.
Susan Blakely as Margot, Jenny's mother, a self-described trophy wife.
Lisa Waltz as Dr. Misty Raines, Vivy's Oncologist, who also has cancer.
Paula Jai Parker as Stargell Grant
Ron Fassler as Teddy Smalls
Ian Ziering as Brian Fowler

Episodes
{{Episode table |background=#CCCCCC |overall=5 |title= |director=14 |writer=24 |airdate=18 |prodcode=7 |episodes=

{{Episode list
 |EpisodeNumber=5
 |Title=The Early Bird Catches the Word
 |DirectedBy = James Frawley 
 |WrittenBy = Barry Safchik & Michael Platt
 |OriginalAirDate=
 |ProdCode=105
 |ShortSummary=Assigned a story about a teenaged whiz kid (Cody Kasch), winner of a word definition bee, Jenny succeeds in reuniting him with his estranged mother. She discovers her father's regular deposits into her bank account are the results of investments he made with the money she won while unwillingly participating in childhood beauty pageants at the behest of her mother. Vivy has a date with the visiting editor of In Person'''s sister publication in Mexico, much to Rick's dismay. Jenny's date with her mysterious phone friend is postponed when Vivy, suffering anxiety due to a partial hair loss resulting from increased chemotherapy treatment, calls upon her for comfort.
 |LineColor=CCCCCC
}}

}}

Reception
Initial reviews were positive, with Varietys Brian Lowry saying, "writer-producer Margaret Nagle brings a level of wit to the proceedings superior to most chick-lit-inspired TV drama." The Seattle Times, after describing the premise, said, "If this all sounds kind of corny, well, it kind of is until you realize the story line hits its mark, making you recall your own missteps and regrets for not having taken better charge."

The Boston Herald stated that "Lifetime’s new dramedy Side Order of Life wants to be the next Grey’s Anatomy'' so badly, it even borrows Meredith's TV dad for the debut," but despite the content of the review, rated it a 'B' and said it was "almost satisfying."

References

External links

2000s American drama television series
2007 American television series debuts
2007 American television series endings
Lifetime (TV network) original programming
Television series by Warner Horizon Television
Television Academy Honors winners